Idols South Africa III was the third season of South African reality interactive talent show based on the British talent show Pop Idol. It was running from August to November 2005.
All four judges returned for another season. After one season Letoya Makhene left the show making Colin Moss the solo host, similar to Ryan Seacrest on American Idol.
For the first time the semifinal groups where divided into genders. As there were only six males who made it to the top 24, only one group was male though. This resulted in a top 12 with only two males for a second year in a row. There was no wildcard show held. Instead the judges each chose one contestant who was not voted in the top 12 directly in the group phase.
Viewer outrage ensued following the elimination of Nhlanhla Mwelse after it was revealed that the 4 judges had a 49% leverage to the total weekly votes & that this happened since the start of the semi finals. Before the series started, it was portrayed that the viewers would account for 100% of the total vote this year compared to the judges' 40% in season 1 & 2.
Karin Kortje, a young mother from Grabouw, Cape Town wowed the audience and judges with her big voice and won the final against Gift Gwe with 62.58% and was also leading throughout the competition by a landside. However Kortje was not so lucky in her personal life after the contest ended as her boyfriend was charged of robbery and murder just months after the show. In difference to the other finalists of her season, Kortje was not invited to take part of the final of the next season.

Finals

Finalists 
(ages stated at time of contest)

Themes 
26 September: Hits 2000
3 October: Number 1 Hits
10 October: Film Songs
17 October: Viewers Choice
31 October: Video Hits
7 November: Judges Choice
14 November: My Idols
21 November: Great Songs
27 November: Grand Finale

Elimination Chart

Live Show Details

Heat 1 (28 August 2005)

Heat 2 (4 September 2005)

Heat 3 (11 September 2005)

Heat 4 (18 September 2005)

Live Show 1 (25 September 2005) 
Theme: Millennium Hits

Live Show 2 (2 October 2005) 
Theme: #1 Hits from the '90s

Live Show 3 (9 October 2005) 
Theme: Music from the Movies

Live Show 4 (16 October 2005) 
Theme: Viewers' Choice

Live Show 5 (23 October 2005) 
Theme: How It Should Have Been Done

Live Show 6 (30 October 2005) 
Theme: Music Video Hits

Live Show 7 (6 November 2005) 
Theme: Judges' Choice

Live Show 8 (13 November 2005) 
Theme: My Idols

Live Show 9: Semi-final (20 November 2005) 
Theme: Great Singers, Great Songs

Live final (27 November 2005)

References

External links 
 Idols III website

Season 03
2005 South African television seasons